Heterogynis andalusica is a moth in the Heterogynidae family. It was described by Franz Daniel in 1966.

References

Heterogynidae
Moths described in 1966